SVISTA (Serenity Virtual Station) is a former commercial virtual machine software product marketed by Serenity Systems International. Windows, OS/2, Linux and FreeBSD hosted versions were available.

This product is no longer available nor supported.

Description
SVISTA was developed under contract with Parallels Software Studio and was based on its existing TwoOStwo software, although the OS/2 and FreeBSD hosted versions were specific to SVISTA.

Providing a virtualization product was initially part of Serenity's strategy for marketing its eComStation operating system.  When the OS/2 port of Connectix VirtualPC was discontinued following the acquisition of its creator by Microsoft, Serenity contracted Parallels to develop SVISTA as an alternative. A beta program was launched in the spring of 2004, with a general availability release in October of that year.

However, the product was discontinued shortly afterwards following the acquisition of Parallels by SWsoft.  According to Bob St. John of Serenity Systems, SWsoft was not interested in continuing the development of SVISTA, and withdrew from the OEM contract.

Although Serenity briefly expressed interest in finding another solution for an OS/2 hosted virtualization product, it was eventually deemed impractical due to increased competition in the consumer market from Microsoft and VMware.

The former product website currently indicates that SVISTA is no longer available, and suggests Virtual Bridges and VirtualBox as possible third-party alternatives.

Issues
When using SVISTA instances in an environment where MAC addresses are used as unique identifiers (UID), it is advisable to manually configure the MAC address for each virtual machine to ensure each is actually unique. One example of such an environment is one in which MAC security is enabled on switches and another example is an environment in which Altiris products are used (if configured to use the MAC address as the UID). If you are in such a situation, simply disable all networks/adapters other than bridged and edit each virtual machine's configuration (.2os) file and change the 'MAC address' to be unique.

Current status
The first and only GA release was SVISTA 2004, released on October 14, 2004.  The final release was SVISTA Feature Release 1, beta 3, which was made available to registered customers in May 2005.

See also
 TwoOStwo
 Parallels Workstation
 VMware
 User-mode Linux
 Xen
 Comparison of platform virtualization software

External links
Serenity Virtual

References

Virtualization software